Ghioroiu is a commune located in Vâlcea County, Oltenia, Romania. It is composed of six villages: Căzănești, Ghioroiu, Herăști, Mierea, Poienari, and Știrbești.

The commune is located in the southwestern part of the county.

References

Communes in Vâlcea County
Localities in Oltenia